Glischrocaryon flavescens is a perennial herb with woody roots that occurs in southern and western Australia.

Taxonomy 
The species was first described by James Drummond,

The current combination, Glischrocaryon flavescens, was the result of a revision by Anthony Edward Orchard in 1970, published in the journal Taxon.

Description
A robust and tufted perennial herbaceous plant with creamy yellow inflorescence at long scapes that appears in February or between August and December. Grows to a height between 0.3 and 1.5 metres. Occurs in clay in sandy soil, but often stony; preferred habitat is plains and rocky hills.

Distribution
The species is recorded in the plant censuses of South Australia and Western Australia, with occurrence becoming infrequent to the north and arid centre of Australia. Records in Western Australia are at the southwest and eremaean botanical provinces.

Ecology
The plant attracts the parrot species, moyadong (Platycercus icterotis)

References

Haloragaceae
Saxifragales of Australia
Flora of Western Australia
Flora of South Australia